Colonel William Preston (December 25, 1729 – June 28, 1783) was an Irish-born American military officer, planter and politician. He played a crucial role in surveying and developing the Southern Colonies, exerted great influence in the colonial affairs of his time, owned numerous slaves on his plantation, and founded a dynasty whose progeny would supply leaders of the South for nearly a century. He served in the House of Burgesses and was a colonel in the Virginia militia during the American Revolutionary War. He was one of the fifteen signatories of the Fincastle Resolutions. Preston was also a founding trustee of Liberty Hall when it was transformed into a college in 1776.

Personal life
William Preston was born on Christmas Day in 1729, in Limavady, Ireland, to Col. John Preston and his wife, Elizabeth. Elizabeth's father, Henry Patton, was a prominent shipwright and merchant, and her brother, James Patton, served with distinction in the Royal Navy. The Crown granted him between 100,000 and 120,000 acres in America to permit British colonization beyond the Blue Ridge Mountains. The family immigrated to Augusta County, Virginia in 1738. Subsequent French and Indian resistance and reversal of British policy limited the impact of the family's grants, but Prestonsburg, Kentucky was named in John's honor. 

In June 1752, William accompanied his uncle James Patton, acting as his secretary at the Logstown Treaty Conference. Patton arranged for William to be apprenticed to Thomas Lewis, the County Surveyor and Patton's cousin, and in November 1752, William was hired as a deputy surveyor. He later served as surveyor in Augusta, Botetourt, Fincastle, and Montgomery Counties, surveying 36 tracts for Patton along the New River.

In July 1755, William survived the Draper's Meadow massacre, an attack by the Shawnee against a settlement that was part of a property later known as Smithfield Plantation, that he purchased in 1773. He completed the construction of his Smithfield Plantation home in 1774.

William served as a captain with the Virginia Regiment on the Sandy Creek Expedition in 1756, keeping a journal which serves as the only complete record of that campaign. Remaining in Virginia, William married Susanna Smith on January 17, 1761, and together they had 12 children. He and his family moved to Smithfield Plantation, in present-day Blacksburg, Virginia, in 1774, and it served as his final home. He previously lived at Greenfield Plantation in Fincastle, Botetourt County, Virginia.

At least 216 people were enslaved as workers at the Smithfield Plantation. In August 1759, William Preston purchased 16 enslaved people from a slave ship in a single purchase.

Political and military life
Preston was elected to Virginia colony's House of Burgesses in 1765 to represent Augusta County and served until the county was divided around 1770. In 1775, Preston was one of the signatories of the Fincastle Resolutions.

Preston served in both the French and Indian War and American Revolutionary War. During Lord Dunmore's War of 1773–1774, while fighting against the Shawnee Indians, he urged Virginians to join the militia to enact revenge on the Indians and plunder their stock of horses. A colonel in the militia, one of Preston's greatest contributions to the American Revolutionary War was his ability to suppress the Tories (British loyalists) from uprising in southwest Virginia during the Revolution. He also helped fight Lord Cornwallis and the British in the Carolinas.

He served as a founding trustee of Liberty Hall (chartered in 1782), formerly named the Augusta Academy, when in 1776 it was renamed in a burst of revolutionary fervor and moved to Lexington, Virginia. Other founding trustees Preston worked with were prominent men in the area, including Andrew Lewis, Thomas Lewis, Samuel McDowell, Sampson Mathews, George Moffett, and James Waddel. It is the ninth-oldest institution of higher education in the country.

Legacy
Preston died during a military muster near Price's Fork, Virginia, in 1783. The cause of death is unknown, but it is believed that he either suffered from a heat stroke or a heart attack. He is buried in the family cemetery on Virginia Tech's campus in Blacksburg, Virginia near Smithfield Plantation. His final home, Smithfield Plantation, has been restored and is listed on the U.S. Historical Registry, and it is open for tours from April through the first week in December.

Many prominent Americans descended from Preston and his wife Susanna, for whom the plantation is named. They were parents or grandparents to governors, senators, presidential cabinet members, university founders, university presidents, and military leaders. The Prestons' son James Patton Preston was governor of Virginia from 1816 to 1819 and helped charter the University of Virginia. Their grandson William Ballard Preston was a congressman, Secretary of the Navy under Zachary Taylor, and later a senator from the Confederate States of America. William Ballard Preston also offered the Ordinance of Secession to the Virginia Legislature that resulted in Virginia joining the Confederacy, and he co-founded a small Methodist college, the Olin and Preston Institute, which was in financial difficulty by 1872. The trustees relinquished its charter and donated its property to the state, which reorganized the campus as the Virginia Agricultural and Mechanical College. Today, it is known as Virginia Tech.

Preston was memorialized on July 27, 2011, with the Colonel William Preston highway in Blacksburg, Virginia.

The city of Prestonville, Kentucky, was erected on one of his land grants and named in his honor. Before 1800, it was the most important town in the county and larger than Port William. One of the first roads built in this section of the state was from the mouth of the Kentucky to New Castle in Henry County.

Further reading
The Smithfield Review, Volumes I-XV.
Johnson, Patricia Givens, William Preston and the Allegheny Patriots. 1976
Osborn, Richard Charles, William Preston of Virginia, 1727–1783: The Making of a Frontier Elite. UMI Dissertation Services. 1990

See also
 William Preston (poet)
 Thomas Preston, 1st Viscount Tara

References 

1729 births
1783 deaths
18th-century Irish people
Continental Army officers from Ireland
People from Limavady
American surveyors
American slave owners
Members of the Virginia House of Delegates
Signers of the Fincastle Resolutions
Virginia militiamen in the American Revolution
18th-century American politicians
Preston family of Virginia
Military personnel from County Londonderry